Ru Long (1916 – July 1991) was a Chinese translator and professor.

He was most notable for being one of the main translators into Chinese of the works of the Russian novelist Anton Chekhov.

Biography
Ru was born in Suzhou, Jiangsu in 1916, his father, who graduated from Shanghai Jiaotong University, working as an officer in Pingsui Railway Bureau.

At the age of 6, Ru settled in Beijing with his family, he graduated from Beijing North China High School.

From 1938 to 1945, Ru taught at Jiangbei County School, Chongqing Fuxing School, Sichuan Bashu School, Chongqing Fudan School, and Sichuan Peiling School.

After the founding of the PRC, Ru became an associate professor at Jiangsu Culture and Education College, Dongwu University, China Literature College, and Sunan Literature and Education College.

Ru worked as the chief editor in Shanghai Pingming Publishing Company in 1952 and he joined the China Writers Association in 1955.

In 1985, Ru was appointed a director of China Writers Association and Chinese Translation Association.

Works
 Collected Works of Anton Chekhov (Anton Chekhov)
 Short Stories of Anton Chekhov (Anton Chekhov)
 The Biography of Maxim Gorky (Rushin)
 The Resurrection (Leo Tolstoy)

Personal life
Ru married English literature translator Wen Ying, the couple had a son and a daughter, Ru Qihe and Ru Yiling, both are English literature translators.

References

1916 births
1991 deaths
Writers from Suzhou
English–Chinese translators
Russian–Chinese translators
People's Republic of China translators
20th-century Chinese translators